Titus County is a county located in the northeastern region of the U.S. state of Texas. As of the 2020 census, its population was 31,247. Its county seat is Mount Pleasant. The county is named for Andrew Jackson Titus, an early settler. Titus County comprises the Mount Pleasant micropolitan statistical area.

Geography

Major highways
  Interstate 30
  U.S. Highway 67
  U.S. Highway 271
  State Highway 11
  State Highway 49

Adjacent counties
 Red River County (north)
 Morris County (east)
 Camp County (south)
 Franklin County (west)

Communities

Cities
 Mount Pleasant (county seat)
 Talco
 Winfield

Town
 Miller's Cove

Unincorporated communities
 Cookville
 Marshall Springs

Demographics

Note: the US Census treats Hispanic/Latino as an ethnic category. This table excludes Latinos from the racial categories and assigns them to a separate category. Hispanics/Latinos can be of any race.

As of the census of 2000, there were 28,118 people, 9,552 households, and 7,154 families residing in the county.  The population density was 68 people per square mile (26/km2).  There were 10,675 housing units at an average density of 26 per square mile (10/km2).  The racial makeup of the county was 88.8% White, 10.10% Black or African American, 1.10% other.  40.6% of the population were Hispanic or Latino of any race.

There were 9,552 households, out of which 39.10% had children under the age of 18 living with them, 59.00% were married couples living together, 11.40% had a female householder with no husband present, and 25.10% were non-families. 22.10% of all households were made up of individuals, and 11.10% had someone living alone who was 65 years of age or older.  The average household size was 2.88 and the average family size was 3.36.

In the county, the population was spread out, with 30.30% under the age of 18, 9.80% from 18 to 24, 28.00% from 25 to 44, 19.50% from 45 to 64, and 12.50% who were 65 years of age or older.  The median age was 32 years. For every 100 females there were 97.80 males.  For every 100 females age 18 and over, there were 94.00 males.

The median income for a household in the county was $32,452, and the median income for a family was $37,390. Males had a median income of $26,466 versus $18,238 for females. The per capita income for the county was $15,501.  About 14.90% of families and 18.50% of the population were below the poverty line, including 25.10% of those under age 18 and 14.10% of those age 65 or over.

Politics
Titus County was formerly represented in the Texas State Senate by Bill Ratliff, a Republican politician who served from 2001 to 2003 as Lieutenant Governor of Texas. Prior to 2000, Titus County was mostly dominated by the Democratic Party at the presidential level, only voting for Republican candidates before then in the midst of 49-state landslides in 1972 and 1984. From 2000 on, it has become solidly Republican at the presidential level along with the rest of East Texas.

Education

The following school districts serve Titus County:
 Chapel Hill ISD
 Daingerfield-Lone Star ISD (mostly in Morris County)
 Harts Bluff ISD
 Mount Pleasant ISD
 Pewitt CISD (mostly in Morris County, small portion in Cass County)
 Rivercrest ISD (partly in Red River County, small portion in Franklin County)

Until its closure, Winfield ISD served Winfield and Miller's Cove. Winfield ISD closed in 2018 and consolidated with Mount Pleasant ISD.

In addition, Northeast Texas Community College serves Titus County, as well as neighboring Morris and Camp counties.

See also

 National Register of Historic Places listings in Titus County, Texas
 Recorded Texas Historic Landmarks in Titus County

References

External links
 Titus County government's website
 

 
1846 establishments in Texas
Populated places established in 1846
Majority-minority counties in Texas